Nansen Island may refer to:
Nansen Island (Antarctica)
Nansen Island (Franz Josef Land)
Nansen Island (Kara Sea)

See also
Nansen Land